

F

References

Lists of words